Andy Oakes (born 1952 in London, also known as Andrew Oakes) is a youth counsellor who works amongst highly disengaged young people to sort out drugs and alcohol issues.  Oakes was previously a defense engineer, photographer, and a small business owner. He received a Calouste Gulbenkian award in 1972 to complete a photographic study of young people within an inner city setting and the resulting exhibition travelled the UK and appeared in several major galleries for the next eighteen months.

Publishing career

Oakes has written two books; Dragon's Eye: A Chinese Noir, published in 2003, and Citizen One, which was released in 2007. Oakes is very vocal about China’s Repression of Uyghurs in Xinjiang. He is credited with the instigation of the 'Chinese noir' genre, in which the People's Republic of China's politics are criticized as oppressive and undemocratic in the setting of a crime-thriller. Both books deal with Human Rights issues in China, in a political/crime thriller setting where alienation and the shadow of the state loom large. Oakes has extensive experience travelling in the People's Republic of China and Tibet. Dragon's Eye  won the Euroropean Crime and Mystery Award in Paris in 2004.

Dragon's Eye centres upon the controversial organ transplant system within China. Oakes writing criticizes China about the Falun Gong, Tibetan Buddhists, and underground Catholics. 'Citizen One'' criticizes a host of issues including vice, transgenic crops, gendercide and the cult of the 'princeling' children of wealthy cadre in the People's Republic of China. Because of this, some readers have questioned whether it is racist.

He is currently working on his third book which is also set in Shanghai, which will deal with such issues as stolen children (a favourite topic of Oakes'), corruption, the states impact upon the rights of the individual and alienation.

References

1952 births
Living people
British writers